"Lionheart (Fearless)" is a song by English musicians Joel Corry and Tom Grennan. It was released on 21 October 2022.
 
To coincide with the 2022 FIFA World Cup, a version featuring English football commentator Martin Tyler was released on 18 November 2022 under the title "Lionheart (Come On England)".

Background and release
Corry and Grennan recorded the track during the course of a number of studio sessions in late 2021. In a statement, Corry said "This record is a new direction for me and an evolution of my sound. I wanted a create an anthem for the festival main stages and I can't wait to perform it with Tom around the world."

Grennan added, Lionheart' is a call to arms. People are living through uncertain times right now, and this song is all about finding the strength to kick back in the face of adversity. I hope you all have as much fun listening to this new tune as Joel and I did making it."

Music video
An accompanying video was released on 28 October 2022.

Track listings

Charts

Weekly charts

Year-end charts

Certifications

References

 

 

 
2021 songs
2022 singles
Joel Corry songs
Tom Grennan songs
Songs written by Mike Needle
Songs written by Tom Grennan
Song recordings produced by Digital Farm Animals